The Cabazon Band of Cahuilla Indians is a federally recognized tribe of Cahuilla Indians, located in Riverside County, California. They were formerly known as the Cabazon Band of Mission Indians.

Reservation
The Cabazon Indian Reservation was founded in 1876. Population on the reservation is approximately 806. The Twenty-Nine Palms Reservation is located immediately to its northwest.

Government
The tribe's headquarters is located in Indio, California. Douglas Welmas is their current tribal chairman.

Programs and economic development
The Cabazon Band of Mission Indians introduced high-stakes bingo to their state, after they won the pivotal court case, California v. Cabazon Band. The tribe has no unemployment.

The Cabazon Band owns Fantasy Springs Resort Casino, 250 room hotel, POM Restaurant, Pizza Kitchen, The Bistro, Fresh Grill Buffet, JOY Asian Cuisine, a Starbucks, and several casual dining areas, located in Indio. The resort also featured Eagle Falls Golf Course.

The Cabazon Cultural Museum is open to the public, free of admission, Mondays to Saturdays. Since 1981, the tribe has hosted the annual Indio Powwow, with dancing, Cahuilla bird singing, drum competitions, and peon games.

History
The tribe came to public attention in 1987 when they won California v. Cabazon Band; prior to the U.S.Supreme Court's decision , the tribe had been the subject of public attention, given claims about events involving John Philip Nichols, The Wackenhut Corporation, and the June 29, 1981 triple homicides of Alfred "Fred" Alvarez, Patricia Castro, and Ralph Boger.

See also
Mission Indians

Bibliography
 Eargle, Jr., Dolan H. California Indian Country: The Land and the People. San Francisco: Tree Company Press, 1992. .
 Pritzker, Barry M. A Native American Encyclopedia: History, Culture, and Peoples. Oxford: Oxford University Press, 2000. .

References

Further reading

External links
 Cabazon Band of Mission Indians, official website
 
 

Cahuilla
California Mission Indians
Native American tribes in California
Federally recognized tribes in the United States
Native American tribes in Riverside County, California
Cabazon, California
Indio, California